General elections were held in Sweden in September 1905.

Results
Only 30.6% of the male population aged over 21 was eligible to vote. Voter turnout was 50.4%, the first time it had ever been higher than 50%.

References

Sweden
General
General elections in Sweden
Sweden